This List of French words of Germanic origin is a dictionary of Standard Modern French words and phrases deriving from any Germanic language of any period, whether incorporated in the formation of the French language or borrowed at any time thereafter.

Scope of the dictionary
The following list details words, affixes and phrases that contain Germanic etymons. Words where only an affix is Germanic (e.g. méfait, bouillard, carnavalesque) are excluded, as are words borrowed from a Germanic language where the origin is other than Germanic (for instance, cabaret is from Dutch, but the Dutch word is ultimately from Latin/Greek, so it is omitted). Likewise, words which have been calqued from a Germanic tongue (e.g. pardonner, bienvenue, entreprendre, toujours, compagnon, plupart, manuscrit, manoeuvre), or which received their usage or sense (i.e. were created, modified or influenced) due to Germanic speakers or Germanic linguistic habits (e.g. comté, avec, commun, on, panne, avoir, ça) are not included.

Many other Germanic words found in older versions of French, such as Old French and Anglo-French are no longer extant in Standard Modern French. Many of these words do, however, continue to survive dialectally and in English. See: List of English Latinates of Germanic origin.

Dictionary

B

Bouquin "book"

Bourg "town"

E

Émoi "excitement"

Esquif "skiff"

H
hache "hachet"
hachette
hachereau
hacher
hachoir
hachure
hachis
hachure "hatching"
hagard "haggard, wild"
haie "hedge"
haillon "rag, tatters"
haine "hatred"
haineux
haïr "to hate"
haine
haïssable
haire "hair-shirt"
halbran (Zoo.) "duckling"
halbrené
hâle "swarthy, sunburnt"
haler "to haul"
halage
haleur
halin
hâler "to dry up, to sunburn"
hâle
hâloir
halle "market"
hallage
hallebarde "halberd"
hallebardier
hallier "thicket" ( < ML hasla < *Frk hasal < Gmc, cf OHG hasala, MDu hasel)
halte "halt"
halt
hameau "hamlet"
hampe "handle, staff"
hanap "goblet"
hanche "hip, haunch"
déhanché
éhanché
hanbane "henbane"
hangar "shed, hangar" ( < MFr hanghart < Frk *haimgard < haim "home" < Gmc, cf OE hām + gard "protection, shelter, yard" < Gmc, cf OE ġeard)
hanneton "beetle"
Hanse "the Hanse"
Hanséatique
hanter "to frequent, haunt"
hantise
happe "bed of an axle-tree"
happe-chair
happe-foie
happe-lapin
happer "to snap"
haquenée "hackney, nag"
haquet "a dray"
haquetier
harangue "harangue"
haranguer
haras "stud" ( < haraz < ON hārr < Gmc)
harasser "to harass" ( < MFr harasser < OFr harrier "to harry" & harer < Frk *hara "here!" < Gmc, cf OHG hera, MDu hare)
harceler "to harass, torment"
hard "hardware"
hardeau
hardelée
harde "herd"
harder
déharder
harde "leash"
hardes "clothes" ( < harde < Gmc, infl in meaning by unrelated fardes)
hardi "bold"
hardiesse
enhardir
hardiment
hardiesse "boldness"
hareng "herring"
harengère
harengerie
hargne "aggressive" ( < OFr hargner < Frk *harmjan "to insult, harm" < Gmc, cf OHG harmjan to scold, quarrel", OE hearm "harm")
hargner
hargneux
haricot "bean"
haridelle "jade, harridan" ( < haras " < Gmc + -idelle)
harnacher "to harness"
enharnacher
harnais "harness" ( < OFr harneis, hernais < ON hernest "army supplies" < herr "army" < Gmc + nest "provisions" < Gmc, cf OE here "army")
harnacher
haro "hue and cry"
harpe "harp"
harpiste
harper "to grip" ( < Frk *harpan "to seize" < Gmc, cf OHG harfan "to seize", OE hreppan "to touch", ON harpa "cramp")
harpe
harpon
harpin
harpigner
harpon "harpoon"
harponner
harponneur
hart "cord, rope"
harde
hase "female hare"
hast "staff" ( < OFr haste "lance, roasting spit" < Lat hasta < Frk *harst "grill" < Gmc, cf OHG harst "roast", Dut harsten "to roast")
hâtelet
hâtelettes
hâtereau
hâtrier
hâteur
hâte "haste"
hâter
hâtif
hâtier "spit-rest"
hâtif "hasty, forward"
hâtiveté
hâtiveau
hauban (Naut.) "stay, shroud"
haubaner
haubert "hauberk" ( < OFr hauberc, halberc < Frk *halsberg < Gmc, cf MHG halsberc)
haubergeon
haut "high" ( < OFr haut, halt conflation of Lat altus and Frk *hauh < Gmc, cf OE hēah "high")
hautain
hautesse
hauteur
hautain "haughty"
hautbois "hautbois"
hautesse (title) "highness"
hauteur "height, haughtiness"
hâve "pale, wan" ( < Frk *haswa- "pale, grey" < Gmc, cf MHG heswe "pallid", OE hasu, haswa "grey, ashen")
havir
haver "to cut" ( < Dial Fr (Walloon) < Frk *hauwan "to cut"; *hauwa "hoe, cutting implement" < Gmc, cf OHG houwen "to cut, hew", OE hēawan "to cut, hew")
averon "wild oats" ( < OHG habaro < Gmc)
havre "harbour"
havresac "knapsack" ( < havre-sac "oat-bag" < Germ Habersack < Gmc)
heaume "helm"
héberger "to harbour, lodge"
héberge
hébergement
hébergeur
héler "to hail" ( < ME heilen "to hail" < ON heill "health" < Gmc)
hellequin "will-o-the-wisp"
héraldique "heraldic"
héraut "herald"
hère "fellow, wretch" ( < Germ Herr or Dut heer < Gmc, cf OE hearra "lord")
hère "young stag" ( < Dut hert < Gmc, cf Eng hart)
hermine "ermine" ( < OFr hermine < Frk *harmo, harmin- "ermine, weasel" < Gmc, cf OHG harmo, harmin "weasel, ermine, stoat", OS harmo, OE hearma"ermine")
herminé
héron "heron"
héronneau
héronnier
héronnière
hêtre "beech-tree"
heurter "to strike" ( < OFr hurter "to knock into" < Frk *hūrtan "to ram into" < *hūrt < Gmc, cf MHG hurten "to collide with, run into", ON hrūtr "ram")
heurt
heurtoir
heurtement
s'aheurter
hie "a tamper, a paviour's ram"
hisser "to hoist"
hobereau (Zoo.) "a hobby falcon"
hochqueue (Zoo.) "a wagtail"
hocher "to shake"
hoche
hochet
hochet "a child's rattle"
homard "lobster"
honnir "to dishonour"
honte "shame"
honteux
éhonté
honteux "ashamed"
hoque "small coat"
hoquet "hiccup"
hotte "basket"
houblon "hop"
houblonner
houblonnière
houe "hoe"
houille "coal" ( < Walloon hoie < Lat hullae < Frk *hukila "heap, mound" < hukk- < Gmc, cf Dut Dial heukel, MDu hokke, Germ Hocke)
houiller
houilleur
houillère
houle "billow" ( < Norm houle "cavity, rabbit hole" < ON hol "hole" < Gmc, cf OE hol "cave")
houleux
houle "brothel" ( < OHG holi "hole" < Gmc, infl by OFr hore "whore" < Gmc)
houlière
houlette "trowel, crook" ( < MFr hollette "shepherd's staff" < houler "to throw" < Frk *hollan < Gmc, cf MDu hollen "to run headlong")
houppe (Zoo.) "a tuft, topknot"
houppelande "overcoat"
hourder "to roughcast"
houseau "spatterdash"
houspiller "to nag, worry, mob" ( < Norm gouspiller < a Gmc compound represented by OE hosp "injury, insult" + OE spillan "to waste, destroy", cf OE ūtspillan "to abuse, mistreat")
housse "horse-cloth, housing"
houssine "a switch"
houssoir "a birch-broom"
houx (Bot.) "holm oak, holly tree"
hoyau "pickaxe, mattock"
huche "bin" ( < OFr huche, huge < LL hutica < Gmc, cf OE hwicce "hutch")
hucher "to whistle" ( < OFr huchier "to cry, shout" < LL huccare < Gmc *hukk-, cf MDu huuc "a shout")
huchet
hucher "to perch" ( < Frk *hūkōn "to squat" < Gmc, cf MHG hūcken, Dut huiken, Germ hocken "to squat")
huchet "hunting-horn"
huguenot "huguenot" ( < Swiss Germ Eidgenosse < Eid < OHG eit "oath" < Gmc + Genosse < OHG ginōz "comrade" < Gmc, cf OE āþ "oath", OE ġenēat "comrade, companion")
huguenotisme
hune (Naut.) "top"
hunier
huppe (Zoo.) "tuft, crest" ( < LL upupa < Gmc, cf ODu hoppe, huppe, LG huppup)
huppé
huppé "crested"
hure "head"
hurluberlu "a fool"
hutin "sharp"
hutte "hut"
hutter
huve "a type of old-fashioned haistyle"

I
ice-boat
ice-cream
ice-field
iceberg "iceberg"
if (Bot.) "yew" ( < OFr iv, ivo < Frk *îwa < Gmc īwo-, īwa-, cf OHG īwa, OE īw "yew")
inlay "inlay"
input (Tech.) "input"
insaissable "imperceptible"
insaissablilité
installer "to install" ( < MFr < ML installare < in- + stallum < Gmc, cf OE steall "place, stall")
installation
installé
installeur
interbancaire "interbank"
interbande "space between bands"
intergroupe
intergroupal
intra-groupe
ive (Bot.) "yew"
ivette
interlope "an interloper" ( < Eng interlope < interloper < inter- + loper < MDu lōper "runner" < lōpen "to run" < Gmc, cf OE hlēapan "to leap, run")

J
jable "cross-groove, gable"
jabler
japper "to yelp, bark" (< OFr japer, OPr jaupar < Gmc *galpōn "to yelp, bark, scream")
jappe
jappement
jardin "garden" ( < OFr < Frk *gardo, gardin- "yard" < Gmc, cf OE ġeard "yard")
jardiner
jardinier
jardinage
jardinet
jars "male goose, gander" ( < Frk *gard "spine, rod, pivot" < Gmc)
jaser "to chatter, prattle" ( < ON gassi "prattler" < Gmc)
jaseur
jaserie
jauger "to gauge" ( < OFr jauge, gauge < Frk *galga, galgo "measuring rod, pole" < Gmc, cf OE gealga "gallows")
jauge
jaugeage
javeline "javelin"
javelot "a javelin"
job "job"
jockey "jockey"
joli "pretty"
joliet
enjoliver
joliveté
joliment
jucher "to perch, roost"
juchoir
déjucher

K
K.O. "K.O., knockout"
kart "go-cart"
karting "carting"
keepsake "keepsake, souvenir"
kermesse "kirk-mass" ( < Flem kerkmisse)
kick
kick-starter
kidnapper "to kidnap"
kidnappage
kidnappeur
kidnappeuse
kidnapping
kieselguhr
king-charles
kirsch-wasser (also kirschwasser) "kirsch-wasser" ( < Germ < Gmc)
kit
kitsch
knickerbockers
knickers
knock-down
knock-out
knock-outer
knout
knouter
kobold "cobalt"
krach
krack
kraft
kraken "kraken"
kriegspiel

L
laîche "sedge"
laid "ugly"
laideron
laideur
enlaidir
laie "a female pig, sow"
laie "path" ( < ML leda < Frk *laid- < Gmc, cf ON leid "way, lode", OE lād "course, path")
laisse
laisses
laisser "to leave, let" ( OFr lesser, laisier < LL lassare "to let, let go, leave", partly from L laxare "to loosen"; partly from OHG lāzzan, lāzan "to let, let go, leave"; cf OE lǣtan "to let, leave, rent"; also from OFr laiier "to leave" < Frk *lagjan "to lay")
laisse
laissé-courre
laissé-pour-compte
laissées
laisser-aller
laisser-courir
laisser-courre
laisser-faire
laisser-passer
laisses
laissez-aller
laissez-faire
laissez-passer
lamaneur "pilot" ( < OFr laman, lomant < MDu lootsman < Gmc)
lambeau "scrap"
lambel "scrap, shred"
lambourde "tie bar, joist"
lambrequin (Archit.) "a scallop"
lampas "lampas"
lamper "to guzzle"
lampée
lande "waste land, heath"
lansquenet "lansquenet" ( < Germ Landsknecht "lands-knight" < Gmc)
laper "to lap"
lapereau "bunny rabbit" ( < lapriel < lap-, probably of Gmc origin, cf Frk *hlaupan "to run, jump", OE hlēapan "to leap, jump, run")
lapin "rabbit"
last "a last, weight"
latte "lath"
latter
lattis
layer "to mark wood, bush-hammer"
layeur
layette "thin layer, baby linen"
layetier
lèche "thin slice"
lèchefrite
lécher "to lick"
léchard
lécheur
léchonner
léchefroie
lège (Naut.) "light in weight or occupancy"
lest "ballast"
lester
leste "brisk"
lester "to ballast"
lesteur
lestage
let (tennis term < Eng let < Gmc)
Lètes "Laeti"
leude "a leud"
leurre "a lure, decoy"
leurrer
lice "lists, tiltyard"
lie "dregs, lye of wine"
lige "liege"
lingot "ingot"
lingotière
lippe "lip, pout"
lippée
lippu
lippée "a mouthful, a meal"
lippu "thick-lipped"
liseré "edging, bordering, trim"
lisière "edge"
liseré
liste "list"
lisière
listeau
liteau
liston
listel
listeau "blue strap"
liteau
liston "scroll"
liteau "a blue stripe"
litre "a black band"
living "living room, sitting room, parlour" ( < Eng < Gmc)
loch "a ship's log"
locher "to be loose"
locman "a harbour pilot"
lof "luff"
loge "lodge, lobby"
loger
logis
logement
logette
logeable
loger "to lodge"
logeur
déloger
logis "a dwelling"
lombes "loins" ( < Lat lumbus < Gmc *lundiz, landwin-, cf ON, lund, Frk *lendin "loins", OHG lentin, OE lendenu "loins" )
lombaire
lopin "bit, piece"
loque "rag"
loquet "locket"
lorgner "to ogle"
lorgnon
lorgnette
lorgneur
losange "lozenge" ( < OFr losenge < Frk *lausinga "flattery, fraud" < Gmc, cf OE lēasung "leasing")
lot "lot, portion"
lotir
loterie
loterie "lottery"
lotir "to lot, apportion"
loti
lotissement
loto "loto"
louche "large spoon"
louchet "grafting tool"
louis (Monet.) "a louis"
loup-garou "werewolf"
loupe "magnifier, magnifying glass"
loure "a loure (dance)"
loutre "otter"
louvoyer "to tack"
lover "to coil"
lubie  "whim"
lucarne
lumbago "lumbago"
luron "jolly fellow"
luronne
lutin "a little one, elf, goblin"
lutiner

M
mâche "mash" ( < Gmc *maisk, cf Germ Maisch, OE māx "mash")
mâcher "to beat, strike, smash" ( < Gmc, cf Germ matschen "to crush, smash")
mâcheur
mâchurer "to blacken"
macle (Bot.) "caltrop"
macle (Min.) "macle; twin"
macler "to twin"
maçon "mason"
maçonner
maçonnage
maçonnique
franc-maçon
maçonnerie
macreuse (Zoo.) "black-diver"
madré "speckled"
magot "bags" ( < OFr mugot "hidden treasure" < musgot, musgode, musjoe < Gmc *musgauda)
maint "many" ( < Gmc *manigiþō "a multitude, great quantity", cf MDu menichte "crowd, great number", OE menigþu)
malart "drake, mallard"
malle "a trunk"
malle-poste
mallier
malt "malt"
mandrin "chuck, mandrel" ( < Prov mandre < Gmc, cf Goth *manduls, ON mondull, MHG mandel)
manne "hamper, basket" ( < Pic mande < Dut mand, mande < Gmc, cf OE mand "basket")
mannequin "mannikin" ( < Dut manneken "little man" < man "man" < Gmc + -ken "-kin" < Gmc)
maquereau (Zoo.) "mackerel"
maquereau "brothel-keeper"
maquerelle
maquereauter
maquereller
maquiller "to make up" ( < OFr makier "to make, do, work" < MDu maken "to make" < Gmc, cf OE macian "to make")
maquillage
maquignon "horse-dealer"
maquignonnage
maraîcher "a kitchen gardener"
marais "marsh; kitchen garden"
maraud "knave, rascal" ( < OFr marault "beggar, vagabond" < OFr marir "to lose one's way" < OHG marrjan "to obstruct" < Gmc + -wald, -walt suffix < Gmc)
marauder
marauder "to maraud"
maraude
maraudeur
marc "mark"
marc "dregs, residue"
marcassin "a young boar"
marche "march, military frontier"
marche "march, walk"
marchepied "a step-stair"
marcher "to march, walk" ( < OFr marchier "to tread, move" < Frk *markōn "to mark, pace out" < Gmc)
marche
marcheur
démarche
mare "pool, pond" ( < ON marr "sea, lake, pond" or Dut maer, maar "pond, lake, pool" < Gmc, cf OS meri "pond, pool", OHG meri "inland sea", OE mere "mere, pool, pond")
marée
marécage "marsh"
marécageux
maréchal "mareschal, marshal"
maréchalerie
maréchaussée "troop commanded by a mareschal"
marmonner "to murmur" ( < ON < Gmc, cf Nor marma, Swed marra "to murmur", Germ murren, murmeln)
marmotter "to mumble, mutter"
marmotte
maroufle "lining paste"
marque "mark"
marquer
marquant
marquer "to mark"
marqueur
remarqueur
démarqueur
marqueter "to chequer"
marqueterie
marquis "marquis"
marquise
marquisat
marri "sad" ( < OFr marrir "to sadden" < Frk *marrjan < Gmc, cf OE mierran)
marsouin (Zoo.) "porpoise" ( < ON marsvin < Gmc, cf OHG meri-suīn "mere-swine", Dut meerswijn)
mash
masque "mask"
mascara
mascarade
mascaron
masquant
masquante
masquer
masquer
masquage
masqué
massacrer "to massacre" ( < LL massacrium < Frk *matsekern < Gmc, cf LG matsken "to slaughter, massacre", Germ metzgern "to butcher")
massacre
massacreur
mat "dull, heavy"
matir
matité
matoir
matte
matité
mât (Naut.) "mast"
mâter
démâter
mâture
mâtereau
matelot "sailor" ( < Dut mattenoot < Gmc)
matelote
matir (Metal.) "to dull, deaden"
matois "swindler, gangster" ( < mate "place appointed for robbers" < Germ Matte < Gmc, cf Eng meadow)
matoiserie
mâture "masts; wood for masts"
mauvais "bad" ( < OFr malvais < *malvasi < Frk *balvasi "bad, malicious" < Gmc, cf OHG balvasi "bad, malicious", Goth balvavesei "spite, maliciousness", Icel bölv-, OE bealu, bealw- "bale, wicked, malicious". Influenced in form by Lat malus "bad, evil")
mazette "bad horse; useless person" ( < Germ matz "awkward")
mé- "mis-"
mégarde "inadvertence"
mégissier "leather-dresser" ( < OFr mégis < Gmc, cf Dut meuk "softening", ON mjūkr "soft")
mégisserie
mégir
mégie
méringue "meringue" ( < MDu meringue "collation of the evening" < Gmc, cf MHG merunge < mëren "to soak bread in wine or water for dinner", MLG meringe < mern "to soak bread in wine or water for dinner")
méringuer
merlan (Zoo.) "whiting"
merlin "marline" ( < Eng < Gmc)
més- "mis-"
mésange "titmouse"
meurtre "murder" ( OFr murdre < L mordrum "murder" < Frk *murþar "murder" < Gmc, cf OHG murdrjan, murdjan "to murder", OE morþor "murder", Goth maurþr "murder")
meurtrier
meurtrir
meurtrière
meurtrir "to kill, bruise"
meurtrissure
miche "loaf"
micmac "an intrigue"
mièvre "roguish" ( <esmievre "hastened" < ON snæfr "fast, nimble" < Gmc)
mièvrerie
mièvreté
mignard "delicate"
mignarder
mignardise
mignon "favourite, darling, minion" ( < OFr mign- < Gmc, cf OHG minnia "darling")
mignonette
mignonoter
mijaurée "a conceited woman"
mijoter "to cook gently and slowly, simmer"
milord "lord, wealthy man"
mitaine "mitten" ( < OFr mitaine "mitten, half-glove," from OFr mite "mitten" < ML mitta < MHG mittemo "half-glove" < OHG mittamo "middle, midmost")
mite "tick, mite"
miton "mitten"
mitonner "to coddle"
mitraille "grapeshot, old iron"
mitrailler
mitraillade
moche ( < Frk *mokka "formless mass" < Gmc, cf Germ Mocke)
momerie "masquerade, mummery" ( < OFr momer < Gmc, cf OHG mummen, MDu mommen "to act a mummer")
moquer "to mock" ( < Picard moquer < MDu mocken "to mumble" < Gmc, cf MLG mucken "to grumble")
moquerie
moqueur
morille (Bot.) "morel"
morne "downcast, dull"
motte "clod, mound"
moue "pout"
mouette "seagull, mew"
moufle "glove, muffler"
moufle (Chem.) "muffle"; system of pulleys"
mouron (Bot.) "pimpernel"
mousse "blunt"
émousser
mousse (Bot.) "moss"; "foam, mousse"
mousser
mousser "to foam"
moussoir
moussu
mousseux
mousseron "mushroom"
mufle "snout, muzzle"
muflier
mulot "fieldmouse"
musard "trifler; loitering"
museau "muzzle"
museler "to muzzle"
muselière
emmuseler
muser "to dawdle"
musard
amuser
musser "to hide"

N
nabot "dwarf" ( < OFr nimbot < ON nabbi "bump, knot" < Gmc)
naguère "lately"
nantir "to pledge, secure, take possession of"
nantissement
navrer "to wound"
navrance
navrant
navré
navrement
navrure
niche "prank, trick"
nickel "nickel"
nigaud "dunce" ( < OFr *nigald, niguald < Frk *niwald "newby, novice" < *niwi "new" + -wald, cf OHG niwi, niuwi "novice, beginner")
nigauder
nigauderie
nippe "clothes"
nipper
nique "a mocking gesture" ( < ON < Gmc, cf Swed nyck "trick")
niquer
niquedouille
nope "small knot"
nord "north"
nordique
Normand "Norman"
Normandie
noue "gutter-lead"
nouille "noodle"
nuque "nape of the neck"

O
O.K. "O.K."
off "Off-Broadway"
off-shore (also offshore) "offshore"
offset "paper used in offset printing processes"
oflag "camp where captive officers in Germany were held during WWII"
ohé (Interj.) "hey!, halt!"
ohm "ohm"
ohmique
-ois adjective suffix ( < LL -iscus < Frk *-isk < Gmc, cf OE -isc "-ish")
-oise
one woman show "one woman show"
one-man show "one man show"
one-step (Dance) "one-step"
onlay (Dent.) "onlay"
-ons (first person plural indicative ending of verbs, e.g. nous mangeons) ( < OFr -omes, -umes < Frk *-omês, -umês; cf OHG -omēs, -umēs)
open (Sports) "open, sporting event"
openfield "open field"
orgueil "pride"
orgueilleux
s'orgueillir
osier "wicker"
ouate "pads, waddling" ( < ML wadda < Gmc, cf Du watte, ON vað "cloth", Swed vadd, Eng wad)
ouater
ouaté
ouateux
ouatine
ouatine "quilt"
ouatiner
ouest "west" ( < ME west < OE west < Gmc)
ouest-africain
ouest-allemand
ouest-allemande
ouest-européen
ouest-indien
ouest-sud-ouest
out (Sports) "an out"
outlaw "outlaw"
output (Tech.) "output"
oxford "oxford"

P
pacotille "business venture; stock of goods"
paletot "large coat, cardigan"
paletoquet
papelard "hypocrite"
paquet "packet"
paqueter
empaqueter
parc "park" ( < OFr < ML *parricus < Frk *parruk < Gmc, cf OHG pfarrih "fencing, enclosure", OE pearruc "enclosure, park, paddock", Dut park "park")
parquer
parquet
parcage
emparquer
parquer "to pen"
parquet "parquet floor"
parqueter
parqueteur
parqueterie
parquetage
pataud "lump; young dog"
patauger "to splash, dabble"
patouiller
patin "skate"
patiner
patineur
patois "patois" ( lit. "clumsy speech" < OFr patoier "to handle clumsily" < pate "paw" < LL patta, pauta < Gmc, cf Germ Pfote "paw", LG pote, Dut poot "paw")
patte "paw"
pataud
patauger
patin
pec "newly salted"
pic "pike, pickax"
picot
picoter "to pick"
picotin
picotement
picoterie
picotin "peck of oats"
pincer "to pinch" ( < Wal pissi < Ven pizzare < Gmc, cf Dut pitsen, Germ pfetzen, pfitzen)
pince
pincée
pinçon
pincette "tweezers"
pingouin "penguin" ( < Eng)
pinte "pint"
pioche "picaxe"
piocher
pique-nique "pic-nic" ( < Eng)
piquer "to prick"
pique
piquant
piquier
piquette
piqueur
piqûre
picoter
piquet
piquet "piquet (card game)"
pistole "pistole"
pistolet "pistol"
pivert (Zoo.) "the green woodpecker"
placage "metal plating"
placard "placard"
placarder
plafond "ceiling" ( < plat "flat" < Gmc + fond "bottom")
plaque (Metal.) "plate"
plaquer
plaqué
plaquette
plaqueur
placage
placard
plat "flat" ( < OFr < LL *plattus < Gmc, cf Germ platt "flat", OE plot "plot, piece of ground")
platée
aplatir
platitude
plat-bord
plate-forme
plate-bande
plafond
plateau "tray, plateau"
platine "plate"
platine (Metal.) "platina"
pleige "pledge"
pleiger
pleutre "coward" ( < Flem pleute "rascal, good-for-nothing" < Gmc)
ploc (Naut.) "sheathing-hair"
poche "pocket"
empocher
pocher
pochade
pochette
pocheter
poltron "coward" ( < Ital poltrone < poltro "lazy" < OHG polstar "cushion" < Gmc, cf OE bolster "bolster, cushion")
poltronnerie
pompe "pump"
pompier
pomper
pompe "pump (shoe)"
pot "pot"
potier
potage
potée
potiche
empoter
pot "hole in the ground"
potage "soup"
potager
potagère
potasse (Chem.) "potash" ( < Germ Pottasche or Eng potash < pot + ash < Gmc)
potassium
pote "pal; large-handed"
potelé
potelé "plump"
poterie "pottery"
potier "a potter"
poterie
potin "pewter; gossip"
potiron "pumpkin"
poudingue "pudding"
pouf "to puff"
poufier
poulie "pulley" ( < Gmc, cf OE pullian "to pull")
prame (Naut.) "pram"
punch "a punch" ( < Eng < Gmc)

Q
Quaker "a Quaker" ( < Eng < Gmc)
quartz "quartz" ( < Germ Quarz)
quartzeux
quenotte "a child's tooth, baby-tooth" ( < OFr quenne < ON kenna < Gmc, cf Icel kenna)
quiche "quiche" ( < Germ Küche "little cake" < Kuchen "cake" < Gmc)
quille "keel" ( < ON kilir, pl of kjǫlr "keel" < Gmc, cf OE ċēol "ship")
quillage
quille "skittle" ( < MHG kegel < OHG kegil "stake, post" < Gmc, cf OE cǣġ "key")
quillier
quiller
quilleter
-quin adjective suffix
quinquin "small child" ( < Flem kinken < kind "child" < Gmc + -ken "-kin" < Gmc)
quincaille "ironmongery"
quincaillier
quincaillerie

R
rabâcher "to repeat over and over"
rabâchage
rabâcheur
raboter "to plane"
rabot
rabougrir "to be stunted"
rabrouer "to snub, scout"
racaille "mob"
raccrocher "to re-hook, hook again" ( < re- + Fr accrocher < Fr croc < ON krókr "hook" < Gmc)
raccroc
race "race, lineage" ( < It razza < Lomb raiza "line" < Gmc, cf OHG reiza "line")
racer
rade "road"; (Naval.) "roadstead" ( < ME rade, raid "road, journey" < OE rād < Gmc)
rader
rader "to travel"
dérader
radoter "to dote"
radoteur
radotage
radoterie
radoub "repair, refitting"
radouber (Naut.) "to refit"
radoub
rafler "to carry off"
rafle
rafraîchir "to refresh, cool"
rafraîchissant
rafraîchissement
ragaillardir "to cheer up"
ragréer "to restore, finish"
raguer (Naut.) "to chafe"
râle (Med.) "a rattle"
râler "to have a rattling in the throat"
râle
râlement
ralingue "a bolt-rope"
ralinguer
ramequin "small cake with cheese"
rampe "flight of stairs"
ramper "to crawl"
rampe
rampant
rampement
ranche "wooden peg" ( < OFr < Frk *runka < hrunga "rung" < Gmc, infl by *hranka "vine shoot, gimlet" < Gmc, cf MDu ranke "branch")
rancher "peg-ladder"
randonner "to hike" ( < OFr randon < randir "to run" < rant "a run" < Frk *rand "a run" < Frk *rinnan "to run" < Gmc)
rang "rank, row"
ranger
rangée
déranger
arranger
ranz "ranz des vaches"
râpe "a rasp, grater, grate"
râpe "stalk (of grapes), stem"
râper "to grate, rasp"
râpe
râpure "raspings"
ras "fast ocean current" ( < ON rās "current, course, race" < Gmc)
rat "rat"
rate
ratier
ratière
raton
rater
ratatiner "to shrivel up"
rate "spleen, milt"
ratelée
rateleux
rater "to misfire"
ratine "cloth"
ratiner
raton "racoon"
rattacher "to re-attach"
rattraper "to recapture"
rayon "honeycomb" ( < Frk *hrâta cf M.Dut "rata" )
rebander "to retie, refasten"
rebâtir "to rebuild"
reblanchir "re-whiten"
reborder "to re-edge, reborder"
rebouteur "a bone-setter"
reboutonner "to rebutton"
rebrider "to rebridle"
rebroder "to reimbroider"
rebrousser "to turn back"
rebuter "to repel"
rebut
rebutant
receper "to cut down" ( < re- + cep "stock" < Lat cippus "stake, beam" < Gmc, cf OE cipp "beam, chip of wood", Dut kip "strip of wood")
recepée
recepage
réche "rough"
réchin
réchigner
réchigner "to look cross"
recracher "to spit out again"
redingote "frock-coat"
refrapper "to strike again"
regagner "to regain"
regain
regain "return"
regain "aftermath"
régal "treat, banquet"
régaler "to regale"
régal
régalant
régalement
regarder "to look"
regard
regardant
regarnir "to refurbish"
regimber "to kick" ( < re- + gimber < gibier < Gmc)
regratter "to re-scratch, rabate, bargain"
regrat
regrattier
regratterie
regretter "to regret"
regret
regrettable
reître "rider, horseman" ( < Germ reiter < Gmc)
relayer "to relieve" ( < re- + OFr layer "to stop, continue, leave" < LL latare < Gmc, cf Goth lātan)
relai
reluquer "to ogle" ( < re- + OFr luquier "to look" < M.Dut loeken )
remarquer "to remark"
remarque
remarquable
remballer "to repack"
remblayer "to embank"
remblai
rembrunir "to darken"
rembrunissement
rempocher "to repocket"
rempoter "to repot"
rempotage
renard "fox"
renarde
renardeau
renardière
rengager "to re-engage"
rengagement
renifler "to sniff at"
renne "reindeer"
reps "rep (fabric)" ( < Eng ribs < Gmc)
requinquer "to spruce up"
ressac "surf"
ressaisir "to re-seize"
retaper "to comb the wrong way"
retirer "to remove, withdraw"
retiré
retirement
retomber "to fall again"
retombée
retoucher "to retouch"
retouche
rêvasser "to dream, muse"
rêvasseur
rêvasserie
rêve "dream" ( < rêver "to dream" < OFr resver "to consider, reflect, be delirious" < Frk *rēswan, rāswjan "to counsel, reason, suggest" < Gmc, cf OE rǣswan "to think, suppose, consider, suspect, conjecture, reflect")
rêver
revêche "harsh, sharp" ( < OFr ruvesche "savage, without pity" < Frk *hreubisck "hard, rough" < Gmc, cf ON hriūfr "rough")
rêver "to dream"
rêveur
rêverie
rhum "rum" ( < Eng rum)
ribote "drunkenness, debauchery"
riboter
riboteur
ricaner "to sneer" ( < rec(h)aner "to bray" < Norm cane "tooth" < Frk *kinni "jaw, chin" < Gmc, cf OHG chinni "chin", OE cinn "chin")
ricanerie
ricaneur
ricanement
richard "a married man"
riche "rich" ( < OFr < Frk *rīki "rich" < Gmc, cf OHG rīhhi, OE rīċe)
richesse
richard
richement
enrichir
richesse "riches"
ricocher "to ricochet"
ricochet
ride "wrinkle"
rideau "screen, curtain"
ridelle "side-panel" ( < OFr "amount of wood on each side of a cart to keep the load" < MHG reidel "log" < Gmc, cf Germ Reitel)
rider "to wrinkle"
ride
rigodon "rigadoon" ( < earlier rigaudon < Rigaud (personal name) < Gmc)
rigole "a trench" ( < It rigoro < Gmc, cf OHG riga "line", LG rige "creek")
rigoler
rimailler "rhymster" ( < OFr rime < Frk *rīm < Gmc *rīma-n "number, series" + -aille, cf OHG rīm, OE rīm)
rimailleur
rime "rhyme" ( < OFr rime < Frk *rīm < Gmc *rīma-n "number, series", cf OHG rīm, OE rīm)
rimer
rimer "to rhime, rime"
rimeur
rimailler
rincer "to rinse" ( < OFr raïncer, raïncier < ON hreinsa "to rinse, clean, wipe" < Gmc *hraina-z "clean, pure", cf Goth hrains "clean")
rinçure
ringard "poker, fuddy-duddy"  ( < Wallon ringuèle "lever" < Germ (dial.) rengel "log")
riolé "striped" ( < rigolé < rigole < OHG rīga "line" < Gmc)
rioter "riot" ( < OFr rihoter, riotter < Gmc, cf Flem revot, ravot "to rub, excite", OHG rīban "to rub")
rioteur
ripaille "good cheer, feasting"
riper "to scrape, drag"
ripe
ris "sweetbread" ( < rides (de veau) < ride < Gmc)
rissoler "to roast brown"
rissole
river "to clench, rivet"
rivet
rivure
rivoir
rix-dale "rix-dollar" ( < Germ reichsthaler < Gmc)
rob "a rubber" (of whist) ( < Eng rubber < Gmc)
robe "dress"
robin
robinet "cock, tap"
robinier "robinia"
rochet "ratchet"
rochet "garment worn under a mantle"
rogue "proud" ( < ON hrōkr < Gmc)
roquet "a pug (dog)"
roquette "rocket" ( < It rocchetto "rocket, bobbin" < rocca "distaff, spindle" < Gmc *rukka-, cf Goth *rukka, OHG rocco "distaff", ON rokkr)
rosbif "roastbeef" ( < Eng)
roseau "a reed"
rosse "a nag, poor horse"
rosser "to thrash"
rôt "roast"
rôtir "to roast"
rôt
rôti
rôtie
rôtisserie
rôtisseur
rôtissoire
rôtisseur "cookshop master"
rouan "roan horse" ( < MFr roan < Sp roano < OSp raudano < Goth raudan, obj case of rauda "red one" < rauðs "red", cf OE rēad "red")
rouf "cuddy"
rouf "deckhouse" ( < Dut roef, cf Eng "roof" )
rouffe "scabies"
rouir "to ret"
rouissage
rouissoir
roussin "a hack, stallion"
rouvieux "mangy"
ruban "ribbon"
rubanerie
rubanier
rustine "rubber repair patch" ( < Germ Rück "back" + Stein "stone" )

S
sabord "port-hole"
sabot "wooden shoe"
saboter
sabotier
sabotière
sabre "sabre"
sabrer
sabreur
sabretache "sabretache"
sac "plunder, sack"
saquer
saccade "shake, jerk"
saccager "to pillage"
saccage
saccagement
safre "greedy, gluttonous" ( < Gmc, cf OHG seifar "mouth-watering, salivating", Goth safjan "to savour, enjoy")
saisie "legal execution"
saisir "to seize" ( OFr < Lat sacire < Frk *sakjan "to claim" and *satjan "to place, establish", both < Gmc, cf OE sēcan "to seek" & OHG sazjan "to place")
saisie
saisine
saisissable
saisissant
saisissement
saisissable "seizable"
insaisissable
sale "dirty" ( < Gmc, cf OHG salo "dull, sallow, dirty")
saleté
salir
salaud
saligaud
saleté "dirtiness"
salir "to dirty"
salissant
salissure
salle "hall"
salon
sarrau "frock, smock" ( < MHG sarroc "military garment" < Gmc)
saule "willow"
saur "dried"
saurer
sauret
savon "soap" ( < Lat saponem < Gmc saipō, saipōn-, cf OHG seifa "soap", OE sāpe "soap")
savonner
savonnette
savonner "to soap"
savonnage
savonnerie
savonnier
savonneux
schelling "shilling" ( < Eng < Gmc)
schlague "military flogging" ( < Germ schlag < Gmc)
scion
scruter
scrutateur
scrutation
scrutatrice
scrutement
scruteur
scrutin
scrutin
scrutiner
sénau (Naut.) "a two-masted vessel" ( < Dut snaauw < Gmc)
sénéchal "seneschal"
sénéchaussée
sénéchaussée "a seneschal's court"
sens "sense, reason"
sens "side of an object considered according to its orientation"
siller (Naut.) "to trail ahead, make a wake" ( < ON sila < Gmc)
sillon
sillage
sillée
sillon "furrow"
sillonner
sillonner "to trace"
sloop "sloop" ( < Eng < Gmc)
snob
sobriquet "nickname" ( < OFr sot + briquet < Gmc)
soigner "to attend to"
soigneux
soin "care" ( < OFr soing < Frk *sunnia "concern" < Gmc)
soigner
sonde "fathom line"
sonder "to sound" ( < OFr sonder < sonde "sounding line" < Gmc, cf ON & OE sund "water, sea")
sonde
sondage
sondeur
sondeur "leadsman"
souhait "a wish"
souhaiter "to wish"
souhait
souhaitable
souille ( < OFr souil "quagmire, marsh" < Frk *saulja "wallow, mire" < Gmc, cf OE syle "wallow, miry-place")
souiller "to sully" ( < OFr soillier, souillier "to wallow in mire" < Frk *sulljan, *sauljan < Gmc, cf OE solian, sylian "to soil", Dan søle "to soil")
soupe "soup"
souper
soupière
souper "to sup"
souper
soupé
soupeur
soupière "tureen"
spalt "spalt"
spath "spar"
spirite
stalle "stall"
installer
stathouder "statholder"
stathouderat
stockfisch "stockfish" ( < Dut stocvisch  )
stop
stopper
stras "strass"
stribord "starboard"
stuc "stucco"
sud "south"
suie "soot" ( < Gmc, cf OE sōtig "sooty")
suint "grease"
suinter "to ooze" ( < OFr suiter < Frk *switan "to sweat" < Gmc, cf OHG suizan "to sweat", Dut sweeten "to sweat")
suint
suintement
sur "sour"
suret
surelle
surin
surin "young apple tree"
surlonge "sirloin"

T
tache "spot"
tacher
tacher "to stain"
tacheter
entacher
taisson "badger" ( < OFr tais < LL taxus < Gmc, cf OHG þahs "badger")
talk-show "talk show"
taler "to hurt someone" ( < taler, taller "to bruise" < Gmc *talōn "to snatch", cf OHG zālōn "to tear, remove")
taloche
taloche "thump on the head"
tamis "sieve" ( < LL *tamisium < Frk *tamisa < Gmc, cf MDu temse, teemse "sifter")
tamiser
tampon "plug"
tamponner
tan "tan"
tanner
tanneur
tannerie
tanin
tangage (Naut.) "pitching"
tanguer (Naut.) "to pitch"
tangage
tanière "lair"
tanin "tannin"
tanner "to tan"
tannage
tanneur
tannerie
tapage "uproar"
tapageur
tape "tap, slap"
taper "to slap"
tape
tapage
tapinois (en) "stealthily"
tapir "to crouch"
tapiner
tapinois
tapon "bundle"
taponner
tapoter "to slap"
taquer "to jolt"
tarabuster "to pester"
targe "target"
target
targette
targuer
tarir "to dry up"
tarissable
tarissement
intarissable
tas "heap"
tasser
entasser
tassement
tassement "a sinking, subsidence"
tasser "to subside"
taud "rain awning"
taude
tauder
taudis "slum"
terne (Bot.) "ternal"
ternir
ternissure
teter "to suckle"
tétin "nipple"
tetine "an udder"
teton "a teat"
tette "a nipple, teat"
teter
tétin
tetine
teton
Thiois
tic "tic, twitch" ( < Gmc, cf Germ dial zecken, Germ zucken)
tillac "a deck"
tique "tick"
tir "a shooting"
tirailler "to pull, pester"
tirailleur
tirer "to draw"
tir
tire
tiré
tirade
tireur
tirage
tiret
tiroir
attirer
détirer
étirer
retirer
soutirer
tirailler
tocsin "tocsin, bell" ( < toquesin < toque < Gmc + sin "bell)
tomber "to fall" ( < MFr tumber < OFr tumer < Frk *tumōn < Gmc, cf OHG tūmōn "to reel, turn", ON tumba "to dance", OE tumbian "to dance, tumble")
tombée
tombereau
tonne "tun"
tonneau
tonnelle
tonnelier
tonneler
tonnage
tonneau "cask"
tonneler "to tunnel"
tonnelier "a cooper"
tonnellerie
tonnelle "a vault, arbour"
toper "to hold the suggested stake (at dice)"
toque "a cap" ( < It tocca < Lomb tōh "pack" < Gmc)
toquet
toquer "to offend" ( < LL *toccare "to knock" < Gmc, cf OHG zuchōn "to strike, jerk", OE tucian "to offend, mistreat")
toc
tocsin
touaille "towel, tablecloth" ( < OFr toaille < ML toacula < Frk *þwahlja < Gmc, cf OHG dwahilla)
toucher "to touch" ( < OFr touchier, tochier < LL *toccare "to knock, strike" < Gmc, OHG zucchōn "to jerk, tug", OE tucian "to mistreat, abuse")
touche
toucher
attoucher
retoucher
touer "to tow"
toue
touage
touée
touffe "tuft" ( < OFr toffe < Frk *topp- < Gmc, cf Germ Zopf "braid", LG topp)
touffu
toupet "tuft of hair" ( < OFr toupe < Frk *topp- < Gmc)
toupie "spinning top" ( < OFr topie < Gmc, cf Eng top)
tourbe "peat, turf"
tourbeux
tourbière
trac "track"
tracasser "to torment"
tracas
tracassier
tracasserie
transborder "to tranship"
trappe "trap door, trap"
attrapper
trapu "squat, stubby" ( < OFr trape < Gmc, cf OHG taphar, tapar "heavy")
traquenard "trap"
traquer "to track"
trac
traque
traqueur
traquet
traquenard
tracasser
trébucher "to stumble" ( < OFr tresbucher < Lat transbuccare < trans- + buccare < buccus < Frk *būk "belly, trunk" < Gmc, cf OHG būh "stomache", OE būc "belly")
trébuchet
trépigner "to stomp"
trépignement
trêve "truce"
tribord "starboard" ( < OFr estribord < Gmc)
tricher "to trick, cheat" ( < OFr trecher < MHG trechen "to shoot at, play a trick on", Dut trek "trick")
tricheur
tricherie
trick
tricoter "to knit"
tricot
tricoteur
tricoteuse
tricotage
trier ( < OFr trier "to pull out from among others, choose, cull", variant of tirer "to pull out, snatch" < Goth. tiran "to pull away, remove" < Gmc., cf OE teran "to tear away")
triage
trial
trialisme
trialiste
trié sur le volet
trieur
trieuse
trille "trill" ( < It trillo < Gmc, cf Dut trillen, ME trillen)
trimballer "to drag about" ( < earlier trinque-baller, alt. of treque-baller < MDu trekken "to drag" < Gmc)
trimer "to run about" ( < OFr trumer < trum "calf, leg" < Frk *þrum "stub" < Gmc, cf OHG drum "end")
tringle "line out, curtain-rod"
tringler
tringlette
trinquer "to clink glasses" ( < Germ trinken "to drink" < Gmc)
tripatouiller ″to tamper″
tripe "tripe" ( < OFr estripe < Gmc, cf OHG striepe, strippe "belt, thin strap")
tripaille
tripette
tripier
tripière
tripoter "to grope"
tripot
tripoter
tripotage
trique "club, cudgel"
triquer
triquet
troche "cluster" ( < LL *drupea, trupea < Gmc, cf OHG drupo, Germ Traube "grape")
troène (also *truèle) "privet" ( < OFr < Frk *trugil "little trough; hard wood" < Gmc *trūgoz, cf OHG trugilboum, harttrugil "dogwood; privet", OE trōg "trough")
trôler "to drag or lounge about"
trombe "waterspout"
trombone "trombone"
trompe "trumpet, horn"
tromper
tromper "to deceive"
trompeur
tromperie
détromper
trompette "trumpet"
trompeter
trop "too much"
par trop
trotter "to trot"
trot
trotteur
trottoir
trouille "fear"
trouillard
troupe "troop"
troupeau
troupier
attrouper
troupeau "flock"
troupier "trooper"
truisme "truism"
trumeau "leg of beef"
tunnel "tunnel" ( < Eng < Fr < Gmc)
turf "turf" ( < Eng < Gmc)
tuyau "pipe, tube, hose" ( < MFr tuyel < OFr tuiel, tuel < Frk *þūta < Gmc, cf OHG tuda, MDu tūte "pipe")

U
ulster "ulster coat, overcoat"
ulster-coat "ulster coat"
ultra-chic "ultra-chic"
ultra-gauche (also ultragauche) "far-left"
ultra-gauchisme (also ultragauchisme)
ultra-gaullisme "ultra-gallic"
ultra-gaulliste "an ultra-gallic"
ultra-hertzien (also ultrahertzien) "ultra-hertzien"
ultra-snob "super conceited"
umlaut "umlaut"
up to date "modern"
uppercut (Sports) "uppercut"
ure (also urus) "aurochs" ( < MHG ūr < Gmc)
urf "turf"

V
vacarme "uproar" ( < Dut wacharmer)
vagon "wagon"
vague "wave" ( < ON vagr "water in motion, billow, wave" < Gmc, cf OHG wag, Goth wegs, ME waw "wave")
vaguemestre "baggage handler"
valser "to waltz"
vandale "vandal"
vandalisme
varangue "floor of a ship"
varech "kelp, sea-wrack"
varlope "a jointer, plane"
varloper
vase "slime, mud"
vaseux
vasistas "casement window" ( < Germ "Was ist das?" < Gmc)
verbiage "verbiage" ( < OFr werbloier < Frk *werbilôn, cf English "warble" "whirl" and "twirl" )
vindas "windlass"
voguer "to row"
vogue
vrac "in a jumble" ( < Dut wrac, cf Eng "wreck", "wrack", "varec", "wreak", "wretch" )

W
W.C. (also W.C) "toilette" ( < Eng water closet)
wad
wading
wagage
wagnérien
wagnérienne
wagnériser
wagnérisme
wagnerolâtre
wagnéromane
wagnéromanie
wagon "wagon"
wagon-lit
wagon-restaurant
wagon-salon
wagonnage
wagonnée
wagonnet
wagonnier
walhalla
walk-over
walkie-talkie
walkyrie
wallingant
wallingante
wallon
wallonisme
walloniste
wallonne
warrant "warrant"
warrantage
warranter
washingtonia
wassingue
water
water-closet
water-closets
water-jacket
water-polo
watergang
wateringue
waterproof
waters
watringue
watt
watt-heure
watté
wattman
wattmètre
wavellite
weber
webstérite
week-end "weekend" ( < Eng < Gmc)
welche
wellingtonia
weltanschauung
welter
wergeld
wernérite
werthérien
western
western-macaroni
western-soja
western-spaghetti
westphalien
westphalienne
wharf
whig
whiggisme
whigisme
whipcord
whist "whist" ( < Eng < Gmc)
whisteur
white spirit
whitérite
wili
willémite
willemite
willi
williams
winch
winchester
wintergreen
wisigoth
wisigothe
wisigothique
withérite
witloof
wolfram
wolframite
wollastonite
würmien
würtzite ( also wurtzite)

Y
yacht "yacht" ( < Eng < Dut < Gmc)
yacht-club
yachting
yachtman
yachtsman
yachtwoman
yankee
yard
yass
yawl
yé-yé (also yéyé)
yearling
yeoman
yeomanry
yo-yo (also yoyo)
yoyoter (also yoyotter)
yole "yawl" ( < Dut jol or LG jolle, a type of small boat < Gmc)

Z
zapper
zappeur
zapping
zeppelin
zig (also zigue)
zigzag "zigzag" ( < Germ Zickzack < Zacke "tack, cog, tooth" < Gmc)
zigzaguer
zigzagant
zigzagueur
zigzagure
zinc "zinc" ( < Germ Zink < Zinke "prong, tine" < Gmc)
zinguer
zincage (also zingage)
zincifère
zincite
zinckénite
zincographie
zincogravure
zincosite
zinguer
zinguerie
zingueur
zinnia
zip
zipper
zippé
zoom

See also
 History of French
 Old Frankish
 Franks
 List of Spanish words of Germanic origin
 List of Portuguese words of Germanic origin
 List of Galician words of Germanic origin
 List of French words of Gaulish origin

Notes

References
Auguste Brachet, An Etymological Dictionary of the French Language: Third Edition''
Auguste Scheler, "Dictionnaire d'étymologie française d'après les résultats de la science moderne" 
Centre National de Ressources Textuelles et Lexicales 
Dictionary.com
Friedrich Diez, "An Etymological Dictionary of the Romance Languages"
Dossier des Latinistes, La Greffe Germanique 

French Germanic
Germanic H